East Mumbai consists the localities of Bhandup, Ghatkopar, Kanjurmarg, Kurla, Mulund, Nahur, Powai, Vidyavihar and Vikhroli. To the south-east lie the neighborhoods of Chembur, Govandi, Mankhurd, and Trombay.

Division
The city of Mumbai lies on Salsette Island. The long thinner protruding landmass just across the Mithi river is the oldest part of the city. This region is called South Mumbai/South Bombay(SoBo) or Town side. The area just north of Mithi river is called Western Suburbs of Mumbai and the area that lies to the east of the airport is called Eastern Suburbs of Mumbai. North Mumbai(North Bombay) is further upwards just across the JVLR that stretches from Bhayander to Jogeshwari in the Western Suburbs and Thane to Vikhroli in the Eastern Suburbs, is primarily the residential part of the city.

Transport

Rail
Eastern Suburbs of Mumbai are served by the Central Line. With the exception of Powai, each of the neighborhoods has a railway station. Kurla is an interchange point for the Harbour Line.

Road
The Eastern Express Highway (EEH) is a major road the runs along the border of Eastern Suburbs of Mumbai.

Lal Bahadur Shastri Marg (LBS Marg) is a 21 km long, major arterial road in the Eastern Suburbs. LBS Marg starts from Thane all the way till Sion in Mumbai.

However, connectivity from the Western part of the city is poor. The Andheri-Ghatkopar Link Road, Jogeshwari - Vikhroli Link Road (JVLR) and the Andheri-Kurla Road are the major road links between the Eastern and Western neighbourhoods.
Santa Cruz – Chembur Link Road (SCLR) which was completed in April 2014 links Santa Cruz to Chembur.

Bus services are provided by Brihanmumbai Electric Supply and Transport (BEST). There are bus depots at Ghatkopar, Mulund and Vikhroli.

See also
Central Line
Western Line
Harbour Line
Mira-Bhayandar
South Mumbai
Western Suburbs (Mumbai)

References

Notes

 

Geography of Mumbai